Tanmoy Mondal is an Indian politician belonging to All India Trinamool Congress. He was elected as a legislator of West Bengal Legislative Assembly from Rajarhat Gopalpur (Vidhan Sabha constituency) between 2001 and 2006. He was suspended from Trinamool Congress for corruption charge on 23 August 2009. His suspension order was withdrawn on 10 June 2018.

References

External links 
Member's List West Bengal Legislative Assembly

 

Living people
Trinamool Congress politicians from West Bengal
West Bengal MLAs 2001–2006
Year of birth missing (living people)